The James Steel House is a historic home located at Newark, New Castle County, Delaware. The original section, a two-story, two-bay, double-pile, stuccoed brick structure, is dated to the late 18th century.  It was doubled in size about 1882, with the facade addition of a two-story, two-bay, frame wing.  It features a two-story bay window on the endwall, a pointed-arch attic window, and German siding.  The main block has had a series of rear additions during the late 19th and early 20th centuries, creating an overall T-plan.

It was listed on the National Register of Historic Places in 1983.

References

Houses on the National Register of Historic Places in Delaware
Houses completed in 1882
Houses in Newark, Delaware
National Register of Historic Places in New Castle County, Delaware